Muppet Mobile Lab is a free-roving, audio-animatronic entertainment attraction designed by Walt Disney Imagineering, that has been tested at Disney California Adventure Park in Anaheim, California, at Walt Disney World in Orlando, Florida and at Hong Kong Disneyland in Hong Kong.

Implemented on a Segway platform, the Muppet Mobile Lab is a two-wheeled science-lab vehicle that resembles a small rocket ship.  Two Muppet characters, Dr. Bunsen Honeydew and his assistant, Beaker, pilot the vehicle through the park, interacting with guests and deploying special effects such as foggers, flashing lights, moving signs, confetti cannons and spray jets.

The two animatronics characters and the special effects aboard the vehicle are controlled remotely by puppeteers, thanks to an advanced control system that allows the controllers to be located up to several miles away from the show location.  On-board cameras, microphones and speakers allow the puppeteers to see and hear guests and interact with them. Muppeteers Dave Goelz and Steve Whitmire assisted in the development of the project.

The project began as a continuation of Disney's "Living Character Initiative," a program that has generated other interactive shows at Disney theme parks including Lucky the Dinosaur, Turtle Talk with Crush, Monsters, Inc. Laugh Floor, and Stitch Encounter.

In 2009, the attraction was honored with the Thea Award for Outstanding Achievement (Technical) from the Themed Entertainment Association.

In October 2016, the Muppet Mobile Lab returned to Epcot.

See also
 Lucky the Dinosaur
 Muppet*Vision 3D

References

External links
 Muppet Mobile Lab video from Epcot (YouTube)
 Muppet Mobile Lab video from DCA (YouTube)
 Muppet Mobile Lab video from HKDL (YouTube)

Walt Disney Parks and Resorts entertainment
Epcot
The Muppets
Tomorrowland
Animatronic robots